Tau Phi Sigma,, is a multicultural college fraternity, founded in 1992 at the campus of the University of Illinois at Urbana-Champaign, now with eight Midwestern chapters and colonies.

History
Tau Phi Sigma is a multicultural college fraternity, founded on November 11, 1992, at the campus of the University of Illinois at Urbana-Champaign. The organization's primary purpose is to ensure its members reach higher states of education, progress the cultural awareness of humanity in all parts of the globe, while maintaining the values of brotherhood, equality, loyalty, respect, and pride. Since then the fraternity has expanded to eight collegiate chapters and two alumni chapters in the Midwest.

Founding
On the campus of University of Illinois at Urbana–Champaign a group of thirteen students attending the university were unable to find a fraternity that satisfied their ideals of brotherhood.  Their intent was to create a brotherhood which would encompass all ethnicities and backgrounds and make men of good character which would manifest itself in attaining a higher education, providing service to the community, and promoting social and cultural awareness. The founding fathers of the organization devised a pledging process which would ensure fraternal bonds would develop and a true brotherhood would form. After twelve rigorous weeks of hard work, dedication, education, and discipline, ending on May 1, 1993, the first seventeen members of a fraternity they named Sigma Tau Phi emerged.

Name change
Another national fraternity had used the same name as early as 1918. As that group had merged into another NIC fraternity and was still known by them as a predecessor group, the new multicultural group at Illinois opted early to change its name from Sigma Tau Phi to Tau Phi Sigma to avoid any confusion.

Founding fathers
Tau Phi Sigma was founded by seventeen young men: 

 Efrain Lazaro
 Vernan Paul Ituralde
 Javier Alberto Ordaz
 Salvador Jaime Garcia
 Elmer Martinez
 Carlos Haro
 Arturo Alvarez
 Francisco Avila
 (one name missing from "the 17"?)

 Mario Del Real
 Juan Pablo Diaz
 Ceasar Arenas
 Guadalupe Odilon Diaz
 Jose Juan Alvarez
 Juan Leonardo Muñoz
 Jorge Covarrubias
 Jose Luis Del Real

Beliefs
The objective of Tau Phi Sigma are:

 To stimulate the ambition of its members
 To prepare them for the greatest usefulness in the causes of humanity, freedom, and dignity of the individual;
 To encourage the highest and noblest form of manhood;
 To aid humanity in its efforts to achieve higher social, economic and intellectual statues.

Purpose and goals
To promote higher education
To serve the community
To provide social and cultural awareness

Open motto
Since its founding the Fraternity has promoted a public, or open motto:
Como Humanos Siempre Unidos, Como Hermanos Jamas Vencidos
      (As Humans Always United, As Brothers Never Defeated)

National Board of Directors
President – Khai Yoo
Internal Vice-President – Ulises Moralez
External Vice-President – Joel Medina
Dean of Associates – John Vazquez
Treasurer - Rogelio Tovar
Secretary – Jose Rios

Philanthropy
Tau Phi Sigma is a service-oriented fraternity. In order to further research and development of major diseases such as cancer, diabetes, epilepsy and cardiologic conditions Tau Phi Sigma established the "Fight 4 Life Initiative" as its national philanthropy. The Fight 4 Life Initiative seeks to develop financial support for the following organizations:

 American Cancer Society
 American Diabetes Association
 American Epilepsy Society
 American Heart Association

Chapters and colonies

Chapters
Active chapters and colonies noted in bold, inactive chapters noted with italics.

External links
Tau Phi Sigma National Website <--Domain name has lapsed

References

Student societies in the United States
Fraternities and sororities in the United States
Student organizations established in 1992
1992 establishments in Illinois